The Jacksonville Sheriff's Office (JSO) is a joint city-county law enforcement agency, which has primary responsibility for law enforcement, investigation, and corrections within the consolidated City of Jacksonville and Duval County, Florida, United States. Duval County includes the incorporated cities of Jacksonville, Atlantic Beach, Baldwin, Jacksonville Beach, and Neptune Beach; the beach cities have their own police departments as well.

History

Jacksonville Police Department: 1822–1968

The first sheriff to be appointed in Jacksonville was James Dell in 1822 when Duval County was incorporated. A town ordinance in 1845 required all free males living in Jacksonville to participate in evening patrol duty. From 1865 to 1869 law enforcement was enforced by the continued occupation of the Union Army and t provost marshal and guard. A civilian Marshal was appointed as head of the department in 1871 along with the creation of the Captain of Police rank. The mayor appointed the captain who would then be confirmed by the city council.  In 1887 the captain of police became known as chief of police. A new charter was also established in 1887 creating a board of police commissioners. The department was composed mostly of African Americans. House Bill No. 4 was passed by the Florida State Legislature allowing the Governor to abolish all offices in Jacksonville and to make new appointments to fill the vacancies. The police force in 1889 consisted of a chief, three officers and 24 patrolmen. The first patrol wagon, pulled by two horses, was used in 1895. In 1904, as the automobile became more popular, the speed limit was set at 6 miles per hour. The first automobile patrol car was established in 1911.

Jacksonville Sheriff's Office: 1968–present
In 1967 a mandate was given by residents of Jacksonville and Duval County with 65 percent of the votes cast in favor of consolidating the city (Jacksonville Police Department) and county governments (Duval County Sheriff's Office). On October 1, 1968, the two governmental bodies were replaced with "a single unified government", the new organization, the Office of the Sheriff – Jacksonville Police, paralleled the name of the new jurisdiction. The four other municipalities within Duval County retained their own police departments. However, the Baldwin city council voted to disband their police department by 2007; at midnight on March 13, 2006, the sheriff's office took over responsibility of police services.

Starting in the late 1980s, the agency adopted the Glock 17 9×19mm pistol as their sidearm. The agency still issues Glock 17s as the sidearm.

On June 2, 2022, Mike Williams announced his retirement a year prior to the end of his second term. He moved his residence to nearby Nassau County in 2021 despite a Jacksonville Charter rule that requires elected officials to live in Duval County. Williams considered filing suit to challenge the law but decided against it. Public criticism that the leader of law enforcement was violating the rules forced Williams to make a choice. Williams stated that his last day would be June 10. Undersheriff Pat Ivey was appointed by Governor Ron DeSantis to replace Williams, and was sworn in on June 11, 2022. A special election was held August 23. No candidate received 50% of the vote, so a runoff was held on November 8, 2022. T.K. Waters (R) beat Lakesha Burton (D) 55%-45% on the November 8th election. Waters was sworn in on Sunday, November 20, 2022, in front of his church congregation.

Elected Sheriffs 
1903–1904      John Price
1913–1915      W. H. "Ham" Dowling
1924–1928      W. B. Cahoon
1932–1957 Rex Sweat
1957–1958 William Alpheus "Al" Cahill
1958–1986 Dale George Carson
1986–1996 Jim McMillan 
1996–2004 Nat Glover
2004–2015  John Rutherford
2015–2022  Mike Williams
June 2022–November 2022 Pat Ivey 
November 2022 – present T.K. Waters

Organization 

The JSO is headed by the sheriff, a Florida constitutional officer elected to a four-year term. By virtue of Jacksonville's consolidated city-county status, the sheriff combines the functions of police chief of Jacksonville and sheriff of Duval County. He is one of the few popularly elected police chiefs in the country.

The sheriff appoints his own senior staff from Undersheriff to Assistant Chiefs.  All sworn members of the JSO are sworn in by the sheriff and are considered under the Florida constitution as his/her deputies.  All sworn members of the JSO are Law Enforcement Officers (LEO) or Correctional Officers with all powers allowed by state law to carry firearms and make arrest.  JSO also employs Community Service Officers, who are unsworn personnel that respond to primarily traffic-related incidents not requiring the full police powers of a sworn officer.

Departments 
The Sheriff's Office is divided into five departments, each sub-divided into divisions, sections, units, zones, and squads.  Each department is commanded by a director with the rank director of a department.  Each division is commanded by a chief.  The department and its sections are as follows.

Department of Patrol & Enforcement 
There are three divisions in this department, and is headed by the Director of Patrol and Enforcement

Patrol Division 
Commanded by the Chief of Patrol who oversees the six patrol zones, each headed by an Assistant Chief/Zone Commander. 
Zone 1: Downtown, Springfield, Eastside
Zone 2: Arlington, Intercoastal West
Zone 3: Southside, Mandarin, San Marco
Zone 4: Riverside, Avondale, Ortega, Westside
Zone 5: Northwest, New Town, Baldwin
Zone 6: Northside, San Mateo, Oceanway

Patrol Support Division 
Commanded by the Chief of Patrol Support.
Community Engagement Section- Assistant Chief
Crime Prevention, International Affairs, Sheriff's Watch, Blight Abatement, Tele-Serv, Police Athletic League
Specialized Patrol Section- Assistant Chief
Aviation, Canine, Mounted, Civil Process, Risk Protection, Offender Tracking, Felony Registration, Police Auxiliary, Traffic Enforcement, DUI Enforcement, Motors Squad

Special Events Division 
Commanded by the Chief of Special Events 
Special Events Section- Assistant Chief
Special Events, Secondary Employment, Emergency Preparedness, Honor Guard, Mobile Field Force

Department of Investigations & Homeland Security 
There are three divisions in this department, and the director holds the title of director of the Department of Investigations & Homeland Security.

Detective Division 
The Detective Division is under the direction of the chief of detectives who is responsible for the overall operation of the division. The Detective Division comprises a Property Crimes Section, a Major Case Section, and a Violence Reduction Section, all of which are under the command of a respective assistant chief.
Property Crimes Section
Auto Crimes Unit – The Auto Crimes Unit handles auto theft and auto burglary investigations, many of which result in civil disputes. The unit also investigates thefts of marine craft, all terrain vehicles, motorcycles and aircraft. 
Traffic Homicide Unit – The Traffic Homicide Unit is responsible for investigating traffic fatalities, and hit and run crashes with serious bodily injury. They operate under the supervision of the Auto Crimes Unit commander. 
Burglary Unit – The Burglary Unit investigates all business and residential burglaries as well as thefts over a certain dollar amount. These squads are assigned to the geographic patrol zones.
Polygraph Unit – The Polygraph Unit is staffed by polygraphists who administer polygraph examinations to suspects, victims, and witnesses involved in criminal investigations.  They also administer polygraph examinations for police and other job applicants as part of their background investigation process.
Economic Crimes – The Economic Crimes Unit investigates forgeries, frauds, including Internet fraud, bank fraud and credit card fraud, along with identity theft, con games, and other economic crimes.
Crime Scene Unit – The Crime Scene Unit is staffed by evidence technicians.
Latent Print Unit – The Latent Print Unit is staffed by latent print examiners who play a vital role in the investigation, identification, and conviction of criminal offenders.
Photo Lab – The Photo Lab is staffed by police photographers who are responsible for processing, printing and maintaining all crime scene photographs.
Major Case Section
Homicide Unit – The Homicide Unit handles current cases while one team handles cold case investigations. The  "hot" teams investigate cases such as murder, manslaughter, suicide, accidental death (except traffic crashes), in‑custody deaths, any death of a suspicious or undetermined nature or a death in which a doctor will not sign the death certificate as well as any incident (except traffic crashes) resulting in life-threatening injury. The homicide unit also investigates officer involved shooting incidents, no matter how serious the injury, and incidents when an officer has been shot or seriously injured.
Cold Case Unit – The Cold Case Team reviews all requests for an investigation, provided the original detective, or reassigned detective is no longer in the Homicide Unit and there is no other active ongoing investigation.
Missing Persons Unit – The Missing Persons Unit is under the direction of the Homicide Unit commander.
Robbery Unit – Detectives are tasked with the investigation of the crimes of armed robbery, unarmed or "strong-arm" robbery, home-invasion robbery, carjacking, and a relatively new Florida statute covering the crime of "robbery by sudden snatching." Additionally, the Robbery Unit oversees the enforcement of the Jacksonville Business Security Code and the Florida Convenience Business Security Act.
Special Assaunt Unit – Detectives in the Special Assault Unit (formerly known as Sex Crimes) are tasked with the investigation of all felony sexual assaults, as well as crimes involving child pornography and lewd and lascivious acts. They also investigate incidents of child abuse, child neglect, domestic violence, elderly abuse, elderly neglect and financial exploitation of the elderly.
Victim Services Coordinator – The Victim Services  Coordinators provide assistance to all crime victims, witnesses, survivors, and their significant others. The coordinator also provides short-term crisis intervention and counseling for law enforcement.
Violence Reduction Section
Community Problem Response Unit – Officers assigned to this unit (commonly referred to as "CPR") conduct proactive street-level investigations in support of other investigative units and in response to crime patterns. 
Gang Investigations Unit – The Gang Unit investigates and monitors known criminal street gangs and validated gang members who commit crimes within the city of Jacksonville. 
Violent Crimes Unit – Detectives assigned to the Violent Crimes Unit investigate felony level battery crimes, such as shootings (where no death has occurred), drive-by shootings, shootings into occupied dwellings, and other aggravated assaults.

Homeland Security Division 
The Homeland Security Division is commanded by a Chief. The division is broken up into two sections.  Each section is led by an assistant chief.

•Assistant Chief of Special Operations encompasses units that include:SWAT; Bomb Squad; Marine Unit; Dive Team; Intelligence Unit; Crisis Negotiators; Unmanned Arial Systems; CISM; Critical Infrastructures; and Fusion Center.

•Assistant Chief of Narcotics/Vice encompasses units that include Narcotics Units; Vice Squad; Warehouse Unit; Computer Forensics; Technical Support and Forfeiture Unit. Detectives are also assigned to North Florida's High Intensity Drug Trafficking Area (HIDTA); Narcotics Task Force; and Internet Crimes Against Children investigations (ICAC).

Department of Police Services 
A director leads the Department of Police Services.  There are three divisions in this department.
Budget & Management Division-Chief
Police Support Services Division-Chief
Central Records-Assistant Chief
Communications-Assistant Chief
Logistic/General Support-Assistant Chief
Court Security-Major

Department of Personnel & Professional Standards 
A Director leads the Department of Personnel & Professional Standards. There are two divisions in this department.

1. Human Resources Division - Chief
Recruitment and Selection
Occupational Health
Personnel Services
Time and Attendance

2. Professional Standards Division - Chief
Training Section - Assistant Chief
Academy
Field Training
Gun Range
Leadership Development
Public Accountability Section - Assistant Chief
Body-Worn Cameras
Internal Affairs Unit
Professional Oversight Unit
Public Relations & Information
Compliance Section - Executive
Accreditation
Internal Audits
Non-Sworn & Sworn Inspections

Department of Corrections 
The director of this department holds the title of director of corrections.  The Department of Corrections has more than 600 state certified corrections officers and civilian personnel with three correctional facilities in Duval County.  The largest is the John E. Goode Pretrial Detention Facility (PTDF) located in downtown Jacksonville. It is a twelve-story building with a capacity of 2,189. The others are the Montgomery Correctional Center (MCC); and the Community Transitions Center (CTC).  The Department of Corrections maintains many various specialized units, staffed by Corrections Officer, such as; 
Fugitive Unit – The duties of the Fugitive and Transportation Unit consist of returning wanted suspects who have been arrested in other jurisdictions to face outstanding local charges, transporting inmates for legal proceedings from one secure facility to another as directed by the courts, handling the extradition and rendition proceedings for fugitives arrested locally and in other jurisdictions, and serving writs of bodily attachment.

There are two divisions within this department:
Jails Division – Chief of the Jail
Jails – Assistant Chief
Prisons Division – Chief of Prisons
CTC – Assistant Chief
MCC – Assistant Chief

Rank structure

Misconduct 

 On 31 January 1925, a local Black man, Willie Washington was murdered by a Jacksonville detective. His body was put on display in the county courthouse. Hundreds came to view and jeer the body.
 The Brenton Butler case involved a 2000 murder investigation where a 15-year-old black male was arrested and charged with the crime. At trial, he claimed his confession was coerced after being threatened and brutalized by detectives. The jury acquitted him after less than an hours' deliberation. Two other individuals were later convicted of the crime. The grand jury investigation criticized the prosecutor and police for their handling of the case but found no evidence of criminal wrongdoing.
 In January, 2003 former officers Aric Sinclair, Jason Pough, Reginald Bones and Karl Waldon were sentenced to federal prison terms for their crimes that included robbery of cash and drugs, kidnapping and murder over three years in the late 1990s.

See also

List of law enforcement agencies in Florida
List of U.S. state and local law enforcement agencies
Brenton Butler case a 2000 case of false confession

References

External links

Official Sheriff's Office Website
Florida Times-Union profile

Government of Jacksonville, Florida
Sheriffs' departments of Florida
Duval County, Florida
1968 establishments in Florida
Jacksonville Modern architecture
Government agencies established in 1968